is a train station in the village of Funahashi, Nakaniikawa District, Toyama Prefecture, Japan.

Lines

Station layout 
The station has two ground-level opposed side platforms serving two tracks. The station is staffed on weekdays.

Platforms

History
Etchū-Funahashi Station was opened on 15 August 1931.

Adjacent stations

Surrounding area 
Funahashi Village Hall
Funahashi Elementary School
Funahashi Junior High School

See also
 List of railway stations in Japan

References

External links

 

Railway stations in Toyama Prefecture
Railway stations in Japan opened in 1931
Stations of Toyama Chihō Railway
Funahashi, Toyama